Artur Kocharyan (born 14 September 1974) is an Armenian former professional footballer who played as a striker. With Ulisses, Kocharyan won the top goalscorer title during the 2009 Armenian Premier League season. He is one of the Armenian Premier League top scorers of all times.

National team
In 1994-95, Kocharyan represented the Armenia U-21 national team, scoring 4 goals in 10 appearances.

Between 1996 and 1999, he was a member of the Armenia national football team. His international debut was on 17 January 1996, in a friendly against Morocco in France. He appeared with the national team in 4 occasions.

References

1974 births
Living people
Footballers from Yerevan
Association football forwards
Soviet Armenians
Soviet footballers
Armenian footballers
Armenian Premier League players
Lebanese Premier League players
Homenetmen Beirut footballers
Sagesse SC footballers
GAS Ialysos 1948 F.C. players
Armenian expatriate footballers
Expatriate footballers in Greece
Expatriate footballers in Lebanon
Armenian expatriate sportspeople in Greece
Armenian expatriate sportspeople in Lebanon
Armenia international footballers
Armenia under-21 international footballers